Elio Capradossi (born 11 March 1996) is an italian professional footballer who plays as a centre-back for  club Cagliari.

Club career
Capradossi is a product of Roma youth academy. He won the 2015–2016 Italian U19 Championship with Roma's U19 team as the squad captain.

In the summer 2016 he was loaned to Bari in Serie B. He made his league debut on 24 September 2016 playing as a starter in the match against Benevento at Stadio San Nicola. In January 2018, after one season and a half spent at Bari, he returned to Roma.

On 6 May 2018 he made his debut with Roma in a 1–0 away victory against Cagliari where he was played in the starting 11.

On 20 July 2018, Capradossi signed to Serie B side Spezia on loan until 30 June 2019.

On 1 August 2019, Capradossi signed to Serie B club Spezia on a four-year contract.

In August 2019 Capradossi was acquired by the Spezia Calcio and in July 2020 had a serious injury to the anterior cruciate ligament which blocked his playing activity for the subsequent ten months. On 23 May 2021, the Spezia-Roma match will sign his return in Serie A after three years.

On 1 September 2022, Capradossi signed a two-year contract with Cagliari.

International career
With the Italy U17 side he took part at the 2013 UEFA European Under-17 Championship and at the 2013 FIFA U-17 World Cup.

He made his debut with the U21 team on 5 October 2017, in a friendly match won 6–2 against Hungary.

He also eligible to play for Uganda through himself or for DR Congo through his mother.

Playing style
Capradossi has been compared to Angelo Ogbonna because of his ethnicity, strength, height and skill. He is great at passing and intercepting the ball, as well as his physical ability and heading skills.

Personal life
Capradossi was born in Kampala, Uganda in a family from DR Congo and moved to Italy at the age of two. He received citizenship from his father who was the former director of Roma's rugby team.

References

1996 births
Living people
Sportspeople from Kampala
Citizens of Italy through descent
Italian people of Democratic Republic of the Congo descent
Ugandan emigrants to Italy
Italian sportspeople of African descent
Italian footballers
Association football central defenders
Serie A players
A.S. Roma players
Serie B players
S.S.C. Bari players
Spezia Calcio players
S.P.A.L. players
Cagliari Calcio players
Italy under-21 international footballers
Italy youth international footballers